Erich Feigl (1931 – 27 January 2007) was an Austrian documentary film producer and author. He produced almost 60 documentaries, mostly for the Austrian ORF but some for BR (Bavarian), ZDF (German) and TRT (Turkish Radio Television) in co-production. He authored books about the Habsburgs, whose restoration he supported, and the historical fact of the Armenian genocide, which he denied until his death.<ref>Feigl, Erich. A Myth of Terror : Armenian Extremism, Its Causes and Its Historical Context, page 7.</ref>

Biography
Erich Feigl was born in Vienna, Austria. He began writing while still a student, but soon switched over to documentary film-making, continuing his career at Austrian State Television (ORF). He toured the Middle and Near East and Western Asia extensively and produced many documentaries about these places and their cultures and religions ("Journey to the Early Christian World", "Men and Myths"). He worked with the Dalai Lama on various projects ("Bardo", "Rebirth").

Feigl became interested in Turkic cultures and history, especially ("Kanuni Sultan"). After 1984 he began writing about the Armenian genocide, and he subsequently also focused his attention on Kurdish issues and the PKK guerrilla organization, which resulted in his book published under the title Die Kurden in 1995.  He was one of the first authors and commentators to investigate this topic in a contemporary context. He also wrote about the history of the Habsburgs ("Kaiser Karl",  "Kaiserin Zita").

Feigl was a long-time monarchist activist, and in 2006 was awarded honorary membership of the Black-Yellow Alliance, which favors the return of the House of Habsburg to power.
Described by Der Spiegel as a "fervent admirer" of Empress Zita, he was part of the monarchist committee which organized her funeral in 1989.

Feigl received the Medal for the Progress of the Republic of Azerbaijan and was an honorary Board member of the Congress of European Azeris.

Feigl had died of kidney failure after being hospitalised for a stomach hemorrhage. He was cremated at Feuerhalle Simmering, with his ashes being buried on February 5 at Simmering Cemetery in Vienna.

A Myth of Terror
In 1986 Feigl became well known after the publication of his book A Myth of Terror: Armenian Extremism: Its Causes and Its Historical Context. In the book's introduction, Feigl writes he had written it as a response to the murder of close friend and Turkish labour attaché, Erdoğan Özen, by the members of the Armenian Revolutionary Army.http://www.ataa.org/reference/diplomats.html  June 20, 1984 - Vienna, Austria: A bomb explodes in a vehicle owned by the Assistant Labor and Social Affairs Counselor of the Turkish Embassy, Erdogan Ozen, killing Ozen and seriously injuring five Austrian nationals, including two law enforcement officers. The "Armenian Revolutionary Army" of the Justice Commandos against Armenian Genocide (JCAG) claims responsibility for the attack. Initially published in German, an English version was later produced. Complimentary copies of the book were distributed by Turkish organisations to US governmental officials, university libraries and individuals. A short time before he died he finished his last book, called Armenian Mythomania.Armenian Genocide Research Center

Dagmar Lorenz, in a book review of author Edgar Hilsenrath for the Simon Wiesenthal Center Annual, notes Feigl as a supporter of "Turkish cryptofascist anti-Armenian propaganda" and condemns A Myth of Terror as a "revisionist publication" that "abounds with misleading details".

Feigl's work was also criticized by Klas-Göran Karlsson for misinterpretations.

Honours and awards
 Austrian Cross of Honour for Science and Art (1990)
 Gold Medal of Honour of the Land of Vienna
 Silver Medal of the city of Vienna
 Gold Decoration for Services to the province of Lower Austria
 Knight of the Order of Saint Lazarus
 Knight of the Sacred Military Constantinian Order of Saint George 

Works

Books
 
 
 
 
 
 
 
 
 
 
 
 
 
 Also published in English as: A Myth of Terror, Armenian Extremism: Its Causes and Its Historical Context, 1986. 
 Translated to Turkish as Bir terör efsanesi, published by Milliyet Yayınları in 1987. 
 Translated to French as Un mythe de la terreur : l'extrémisme arménien: ses causes et ses origines; une documentation illustrée Salzburg : Druckhaus Nonntal, 1991. 
 Pravda o terrore : armi︠a︡nskiĭ terrorizm—istoki i prichiny Baku : Azerbaĭdzhanskoe gos. izd-vo, 2000. 
 La mitomanía Armenia : el extremismo Armenio: causas y contexto histórico Freilassing; Salzburg : Edition Zeitgeschichte, 2007. 
 
 
 Halbmond und Kreuz. Marco d'Aviano und die Rettung Europas. Amalthea, Wien 1983, 
 
 
 Translated to French as Zita de Habsburg : mémoires d'un empire disparu, Paris : Criterion, 1991 
  
 

 Films 
 Reise in die frühchristliche Welt and Die Erben der frühchristlichen Welt Die Weltreligionen: Buddhismus, Hinduismus, Schintoismus, Islam, Christentum Ein Tropentraum Der Goldschatz Menschen und Mythen (Die Sikhs, die Parsen, das Bardo etc.) Kaiserin Zita and Otto von Habsburg and Alois Musil (about Syria, Iraq),
 Die Religionen des Zweistromlandes („An den Strömen des Paradieses“),
 Wenn die Götter lieben in the Wasser ist Macht project
 A myth of terror (about ASALA actions)
 Die Wiedergeburt and Bardo and Buddhismus'' (about the Dalai Lama)

References

External links 
 
 Erich Feigl, Library Thing

Austrian film producers
Austrian monarchists
Deniers of the Armenian genocide
Austrian conspiracy theorists
1931 births
2007 deaths
Recipients of the Tereggi Medal
Recipients of the Austrian Cross of Honour for Science and Art
Deaths from kidney failure
Conservatism in Austria